Adriaen van Bloemen or Adriaen Bloem (baptized on 27 February 1639 – c. 1697) was a Flemish painter, print designer, draughtsman and engraver. He was mainly a portrait artist who created individual and group portraits.  He left his native Antwerp to work in Vienna where he became court painter to Emperor Leopold I. His work is mainly known through the prints made after it by various engravers.

Life
Van Bloemen was born in Antwerp. In the guild year 1656-1657, he was registered at the Antwerp Guild of Saint Luke as a pupil of Jan Peeters I, a painter known for his seascapes and topographical drawings.  There is no record of him becoming admitted as a master at the Antwerp Guild.

He left his native Antwerp to work in Vienna where he became court painter to Emperor Leopold I.  The date of his arrival in Vienna is not known. He is first recorded in Vienna on 10 July 1668 when he was married to Maria Caecilia Offenbach, the daughter of Jacob von Offenbach. 

The place and time of van Bloemen's death are not known.  It is believed he died in Vienna in or after 1694. He is last recorded in Vienna on 30 January 1694, the date on which his wife died.

Work
While he trained under an artist who was a landscape artist, van Bloemen specialised in portrait painting. He created individual and group portraits. His work is mainly known through the prints made after it by various engravers.  While in Vienna, he signed his works with "A. Bloem".

Very few paintings are attributed to him.  There is a signed Portrait of Prince Gundakar von Dietrichstein at the Libochovice Castle.  The painting In the draper's shop (1670s, Hallwyl Museum), which is signed 'A Bloem. f' (right on front of the business desk) shows that he may have been inspired by the paintings he saw in Vienna. There was a painting on the same subject in the collection of the emperor (now in the Kunsthistorisches Museum in Vienna) referred to as A Gentlemen in the Draper's shop by the Dutch painter Frans van Mieris the Elder.  A group portrait signed. 'A. Bloem' was auctioned in Amsterdam on 15/16 April 1902 but its location is currently unknown.

Van Bloemen collaborated on the publication Historia di Leopoldo Cesare written by Galeazzo Gualdo Priorato and published in Vienna by the Flemish publisher from Antwerp Johann Baptist Hacque.  The first and second volumes of the book were published in 1670 and a third one in 1674. The first volume described the political and military successes of Emperor Leopold I between 1656 and 1670.  It was mainly illustrated with prints made by Flemish and Dutch printmakers after designs by other Netherlandish artists as well as artists from Germany and Italy. The illustrations mainly depict portraits of European monarchs and important aristocrats, castle scenes, battle scenes, maps and ceremonies. Apart from Van Bloemen, the Dutch and Flemish artists contributing were Frans Geffels, Jan de Herdt, Franciscus van der Steen, Gerard Bouttats, Cornelis Meyssens, Sebastian van Dryweghen and Jacob Toorenvliet.  German artists Moritz Lang, Johann Martin Lerch and Johann Holst and Italians Il Bianchi, Marco Boschini and Leonardus Hen.t Venetiis also contributed.  Van Bloemen provided a number of the designs of the portraits which are signed 'A Bloem' on the prints. These designs were engraved by other artists and included in this work.

References

External links

1639 births
1690s deaths
Artists from Antwerp
Flemish engravers
Flemish Baroque painters
Flemish portrait painters